Mary Aileen Conquest-Allen (December 22, 1888 – September 4, 1950) was an American diver who competed in the 1920 Summer Olympics. She was born on Prince Edward Island, Canada.

In 1913, Allen was one of the founding members of an all-woman swimming club at the Bimini Baths in Los Angeles, California, which was formed in response to strict dress codes imposed by other clubs. She was later elected captain of the club.

Allen appeared in silent films. Her most notable role was Mrs. Westfall in the 1916 Metro Pictures release Mister 44. During World War I, she sold war bonds as a representative of Keystone Studios.

In 1920, she finished fourth in the 3 metre springboard event.

During the 1928 Summer Olympics, Allen served as the coach for the United States women's track and field team. She coached the United States women's swim team during the 1932 Summer Olympics.

Filmography
Mister 44 (1916) — as Mrs. Westfall
Luke and the Mermaids (1916)
Luke's Speedy Club Life (1916)
Mutual Weekly, No. 37 (1915) — as herself
Settled at the Seaside (1915) — as girl on pier (uncredited)
Those Bitter Sweets (1915) — as beach girl at picnic (uncredited)
He Got Himself a Wife (1915) — as Sophia
Their Husbands (1913) — as herself

References

External links
Aileen Allen's obituary

1888 births
1950 deaths
American female divers
Olympic divers of the United States
Divers at the 1920 Summer Olympics